Groan Ups is a comedy play by Henry Lewis, Jonathan Sayer and Henry Shields of Mischief Theatre.

Plot summary
The play revolves around the relationships between five school-friends are explored at three stages of their lives: in Year Two in 1994, Year Nine in 2001, and at a school reunion in the present day.

Productions 
The play opened on 20 September 2019 and ran until 1 December 2019 at the Vaudeville Theatre in London's West End, making it the third Mischief Theatre production running simultaneously alongside The Play That Goes Wrong and The Comedy About a Bank Robbery. The cast performed a scene from the play on the 2019 Royal Variety Performance.

The play was to begin a UK tour in August 2020, however due to the COVID-19 pandemic it was postponed and opened at the Theatre Royal, Bath on the 12th August 2021.

Cast and characters

External links 

 Official website

References 

2019 plays
Comedy plays
West End plays
British plays
Mischief Theatre
Plays set in the 1990s
Plays set in the 21st century